The Bréguet Type II was the second fixed-wing aircraft design produced by Louis Bréguet. Built during late 1909, it was soon discarded in favour of his next design, the Bréguet Type III

Design
Like Bréguet's previous design, the Bréguet Type I, the structure was principally of metal, although less highly stressed parts such as the tail surfaces used wood.  It had a triangular section fuselage of wire-braced steel tube with the  air-cooled Renault engine at the front: this drove a three-bladed propeller which was connected to the engine's camshaft and so revolved at half the speed of the engine.  The wings had pressed aluminium ribs threaded onto a mainspar of  diameter steel tube.  These were connected by a single interplane strut on either side.  Tail surfaces consisted of a pair of horizontal surfaces, the lower carried on the rear of the fuselage and the upper by a pair of  booms running back from the centre section of the upper wing. The upper surface was  movable to achieve pitch control. A rectangular balanced rudder was mounted between the two horizontal surfaces.  In addition a pair of small horizontal stabilising surfaces were mounted at the front of the aircraft either side of the engine.  The pilot's seat was positioned halfway between the wings and the tail surfaces: a passenger seat was fitted behind the engine. The main undercarriage employed oleo-pneumatic suspension, and there was a single steerable tailwheel.

It was intended that lateral stability would be achieved by automatic differential movement of the two halves of the upper wing, this feature being the subject of a patent filed by Bréguet.  In a turn, the greater speed of the outer wing would cause the angle of attack to be reduced,  so eliminating the increase in lift that the greater speed would otherwise have produced.  Lateral control was effected by a pair of mid-gap ailerons mounted on the interplane struts: these were evidently not effective and Bréguet intended to use another method for lateral control in his next design.

Operational history
Its  first recorded flight was made on 5 January 1910, when Louis Breguest made three circuits of the flying field at La Brayelle near Douai. and on 16 January 1910 it made a flight of     However, by April 1910 Bréguet was flying his next design, the Type III.

Specifications

References

  II
1910s French experimental aircraft
Biplanes
Aircraft first flown in 1910
Single-engined tractor aircraft